Miguel Espinós Curto (12 January 1947 – 16 March 2006) was a Spanish cyclist. He won a bronze and a silver medal at the UCI Motor-paced World Championships in 1974 and 1975, respectively. He competed at the 1972 Summer Olympics in the 4000 m individual pursuit and finished in 17th place. Between 1972 and 1975 he won every national championship in this event.

References

1947 births
2006 deaths
Olympic cyclists of Spain
Spanish male cyclists
Cyclists from Catalonia
Cyclists at the 1972 Summer Olympics
People from Baix Ebre
Sportspeople from the Province of Tarragona
20th-century Spanish people